Zyfflich is a village in Germany near the Dutch city of Nijmegen in the municipality of Kranenburg, Kreis Kleve in the State of North Rhine-Westphalia.

Location
Like nearby Wyler, Zyfflich lies on the German-Dutch border, a few kilometres from the Dutch city of Nijmegen (German: Nimwegen), in the western extremity of Kranenburg municipality. This municipality has a significant proportion of Dutch nationals resident within its boundaries; and the westernmost villages in the municipality of Kranenburg to some extent function as dormitories for people who work in the Dutch city of Nijmegen.

Sankt-Martin-Kirche
Among significant buildings in Zyfflich is the Sankt-Martin-Kirche. The original part of Sankt-Martin-Kirche is said to date from circa 1010, reputedly the oldest church building in the Kleve district. The building underwent significant alteration and development in the 14th and 15th centuries.

During its long history the structure sustained substantial war damage.

References

See also
 Kranenburg, North Rhine-Westphalia#Towns and villages in the municipality
 Wyler, North Rhine-Westphalia
 Kleve (district)#Towns and municipalities
 Nijmegen#Proximity of border with Germany

Villages in North Rhine-Westphalia